Sun Mingming (born August 23, 1983) is a Chinese former professional basketball player. He is the tallest professional basketball player in the world and was measured by the Guinness World Records as 2.36m tall and weighing 168kg.

Early life
He was born in a small town near Bayan County, Harbin in Heilongjiang Province, China. He has two siblings: a brother and a sister.  He did not begin playing basketball until he was 15 years old.

College career
Sun attended and played basketball at Ventura College, a community college in Ventura, CA. He played basketball there for only the 2005–2006 season, before moving on to play professional basketball.

Basketball career

United States
Sun played with several American minor league teams, including the USBL team Dodge City Legend, the ABA team Maryland Nighthawks, and the IBL team Grand Rapids Flight. He was also drafted by the Harlem Globetrotters in 2007, being the tallest player in their history to be drafted by them, although he would never play for them.

Mexico and Japan
Later, Sun played in the Mexican league with Fuerza Regia and in Japan's bj league with Hamamatsu Phoenix.

Return to China
In 2009, he returned to China to play for the Beijing Ducks in the Chinese Basketball Association (CBA). Sun and the Ducks advanced to the 2012 CBA Finals but the Ducks lost in the finals that year. He was a part of the Ducks'  2014 CBA Finals and 2015 CBA Finals championship winning teams.

Personal life
In the summer of 2005, Sun discovered that he had a benign tumor attached to his pituitary gland. Because he had neither health insurance nor enough money to pay for the more than $100,000 in medical bills, his sports agent, Avery Loi, started a fundraiser to raise the necessary money. The tumor was successfully removed on September 26, 2005.

Filmography

Film

TV series

References

External links

An article about him in Al-Ahram 

1983 births
21st-century Chinese male actors
Basketball players from Harbin
Beijing Ducks players
Centers (basketball)
Chinese expatriate basketball people in the United States
Chinese expatriate sportspeople in Japan
Chinese expatriate sportspeople in Mexico
Chinese male film actors
Chinese male television actors
Chinese men's basketball players
Expatriate sportspeople in Mexico
Fuerza Regia de Monterrey players
Living people
Male actors from Harbin
Male actors from Heilongjiang
People with acromegaly
People with gigantism
San-en NeoPhoenix players